Ella Nicholas (born 15 December 1990 in Tauranga, New Zealand) is a Cook Islands slalom canoeist who has competed since 2007.

At the 2012 Summer Olympics in London she took part in the K1 event, finishing 18th in the heats, failing to qualify for the semifinals.

At the 2016 Summer Olympics in Rio de Janeiro, she finished 18th in the heats of the K1 event and did not qualify for the semifinals. She was the flag bearer for the Cook Islands during the Parade of Nations.

Her brother Bryden also represented Cook Islands at the 2016 Summer Olympics in canoe slalom. Her sister Jane Nicholas has qualified to
Represent the Cook Islands at the delayed 2020 Tokyo Olympics.

References

Sports-Reference.com profile

External links

Cook Island female canoeists
New Zealand female canoeists
Sportspeople from Tauranga
1990 births
Living people
Olympic canoeists of the Cook Islands
Canoeists at the 2012 Summer Olympics
Canoeists at the 2016 Summer Olympics